The Mulam language is a Kam–Sui language spoken mainly in Luocheng County, Hechi, Northern Guangxi by the Mulao people. The greatest concentrations are in Dongmen and Siba communes. Their autonym is mu6 lam1. The Mulam also call themselves kjam1, which is probably cognate with lam1 and the Dong people's autonym "Kam" (Wang & Zheng 1980).

The Mulam language, like Dong, does not have voiced stop, but does have a phonemic distinction between unvoiced and voiced nasals and laterals. It has a system of eleven distinct vowels. It is a tonal language with ten tones and 65% of its vocabulary is shared with the Zhuang and Dong languages.

The language of Mulam leads to a comparison between two languages as Graham Thurgood states, "For 'headlouse', the KS forms are highly irregular: Kam, Mulam…" (Oceanic Linguistics, Vol. 33, No 2). This relates to the way in which one language can be interpreted through another language, which displays a level of diversity as they may derive different meanings from the translations. Within Mulam Phonology, there is a display of the syllables for Mulam that seems very difficult to decipher without having much knowledge of how they communicate with the dialect. The Mulam ethnic group traces back to the Yuan dynasty (1271–1368), differing from the current society they have now as the people of Mulam eventually split in the Qing dynasty (1644–1912).

The majority of the Mulam population are bilingual in the Zhuang languages.

Dialects
The following Mulam dialects are described by Wang & Zheng (1980) (all of which are spoken in Luocheng Mulao Autonomous County).

 Dongmen 东门镇 (in Dayin 大银, Dafu 大福村, Le'e 勒俄村 etc.)
 Long'an 龙岸镇 (in Liangsi 良泗, etc.)
 Huangjin 黄金镇 (in Zhongjian 中间寨, etc.); documented in Qiu (2004)
 Qiaotou 桥头镇 (in Dongnong 洞弄屯, etc.)
 Siba 四把镇 (in Dawu 大梧, Miao'er 苗儿屯, Shuangzhai 双寨村, etc.); documented in Guangxi (2008)
 Xiali 下里乡 (in Xiecun 谢村, etc.)

The following comparison of Mulam dialects is from Ni Dabai (2010:221-222).

References

Further reading
 Edmondson, Jerold A. and David B. Solnit, eds. Comparative Kadai: Linguistic studies beyond Tai. Summer Institute of Linguistics Publications in Linguistics, 86. Dallas: Summer Institute of Linguistics and the University of Texas at Arlington, 1988.
 王均, 郑国乔 / Wang Jun, Zheng Guoqiao. 仫佬语简志 / Mulao yu jian zhi (A Sketch of Mulao [Mulao]). Beijing: 民族出版社: 新華書店发行 / Min zu chu ban she: Xin hua shu dian fa xing, 1980.
 Zheng, G. 1988. The influences of Han on the Mulam language. In Edmondson, Jerold, A (ed). Comparative Kadai: Linguistic Studies Beyond Tai. SIL International Publications in Linguistics.
 Thurgood, G. Tai-Kadai and Austronesian: The Nature of the Historical Relationship University of Hawaiʼi Press. Oceanic Linguistics. 1962–2012.
 "The Mulam Ethnic Group." MSD China. Web. 1 May 2016.

External links
Mulam (Dongmen) word list from the Austronesian Basic Vocabulary Database
Mulam (Siba) word list from the Austronesian Basic Vocabulary Database
The Endangered Languages Project
 An audio sample of the Mulam language can be listened through Global Recordings Network.
 Mulam Phonology
 Mulam Ethnic Group

Languages of China
Kam–Sui languages
Guangxi